António de Sousa or António Sousa may refer to:

 António Sousa (born 1957), Portuguese former footballer and coach
 António Sousa (runner) (born 1970), Portuguese marathon runner
 Antonio Sousa Alonso (1942–2013), Portuguese professor of chemistry
 António Sousa Chicharo, Portuguese nobleman and 12th Lord of Santarém
 António Sousa Freitas (1921–2004), Portuguese poet
 António Sousa Gomes (1936–2015), Portuguese politician and administrator
 António Sousa Lara (born 1952), Portuguese university professor, nobleman and politician
 António Sousa Pereira (born 1961), Portuguese professor, medic and Dean of Universidade do Porto
 Antônio de Sousa (died 1631), Brazilian nobleman
 António de Sousa (poet) (1898–1981), Portuguese poet
 António de Sousa Bastos (1844–1911), Portuguese dramatist and journalist
 Antonio de Sousa Braga (born 1941), Portuguese bishop
 Antônio de Sousa Braga, Brazilian politician
 António de Sousa Costa (born 1926), Portuguese historian
 António de Sousa Coutinho (fl. 1600s), governor of Portuguese Ceylon
 António de Sousa de Macedo (1606–1682), Portuguese diplomat and writer
 António de Sousa Franco (1942–2004), Portuguese economist and politician
 António de Sousa Hilário (1841—?), Portuguese journalist and writer
 António de Sousa Horta Sarmento Osório (1882–1960), Portuguese writer, sportsman and politician
 António de Sousa Júnior (1871–1938), Portuguese medic and politician
 Antônio de Sousa Leão (1808–1882), Brazilian nobleman
 António de Sousa Lima (1756–1827), Portuguese military leader
 António de Sousa Machado (fl. 1800s), Brazilian politician
 Antônio de Sousa Martins (1829–1896), Brazilian jurist and magistrate
 António de Sousa Maya (1888–1969), Portuguese aviator and soldier
 António de Sousa Meneses (fl. 1600s), Portuguese colonial administrator
 Antônio de Sousa Neto (1803–1866), Brazilian political and military leader
 Antônio de Sousa Peixoto (fl. 1900s), Brazilian politician
 Antônio de Sousa Queirós (1878–?), Brazilian politician
 António de Sousa Vadre Castelino e Alvim (born 1928), Portuguese politician
 Antônio Brito Sousa Gaioso (fl. 1800s), Brazilian politician
 Antônio Alves de Sousa Carvalho (1832–1885), Brazilian politician and writer
 António Augusto de Sousa (1883–?), Portuguese colonial administrator
 António Borges de Medeiros Dias da Câmara e Sousa (1829–1913), Portuguese politician
 António Caetano de Sousa (1674–1759), Portuguese writer and genealogist
 Antônio Caio da Silva Souza (born 1980), Brazilian footballer
 António Carneiro de Sousa (1680— ca. 1755), Portuguese nobleman
 Antônio de Albuquerque Sousa Filho (born 1938), Brazilian professor and writer
 António Damaso de Castro e Sousa (1804–1876), Portuguese priest and writer
 Antônio Emiliano de Sousa Castro (1847–1929), Brazilian nobleman
 António Florêncio de Sousa Pinto (1818–1890), Portuguese politician and writer
 Antônio Francisco de Paula Souza (1843—1917), Brazilian engineer and politician
 Antônio Gonçalves Teixeira e Sousa (1812–1861), Brazilian writer
 Antônio Herculano de Sousa Bandeira (1813–1884), Brazilian professor and lawyer
 Antônio Herculano de Sousa Bandeira Filho (1854—1890), Brazilian lawyer and writer
 Antônio José de Melo e Sousa (1867–1955), Brazilian politician
 António José de Sousa Barroso (1854–1918), Portuguese missionary and bishop
 António José Fernandes de Sousa (born 1955), Portuguese economist
 António José Pereira da Silveira e Sousa (1793—1881), Portuguese judge
 António José Xavier de Camões de Albuquerque Moniz e Sousa (1736–1755), Portuguese politician
 António Lino de Sousa Horta Osório (born 1933), Portuguese lawyer and sportsman
 António Luís de Sousa, 2nd Marquis of Minas (1644–1721), Portuguese general and governor-general
 Antônio Manuel de Sousa (1776—1857), Brazilian priest and politician
 Antônio Marcelo Teixeira Sousa (born 1957), Brazilian politician and engineer
 Antonio Marcos Sousa (born 1990), Brazilian-East Timorese footballer
 António Maria de Sousa Horta e Costa (1859–1931), Portuguese nobleman, jurist, magistrate and politician
 António Mariano de Sousa (1842—?), Portuguese Presbyter
 António Martins de Sousa (fl. 1900s), Portuguese journalist
 António Mota de Sousa Horta-Osório (born 1964) is a Portuguese banker
 Antônio Penaforte de Sousa (fl. 1900s), Brazilian politician
 Antônio Pereira de Sousa Barros (1815–1884), Brazilian plantation owner
 Antônio Pereira de Sousa Calheiros (fl. 1800s), Brazilian architect
 António Pereira de Sousa da Câmara (1901–1971), Portuguese professor of engineering
 Antônio Pompeu de Sousa Brasil (1851–1886), Brazilian medic, writer and politician
 António Rebelo de Sousa (born 1952), Portuguese economist
 Antônio Rodrigues de Sousa (1902–?), Brazilian politician
 Antônio Saturnino de Sousa e Oliveira (1809–1877), Brazilian politician
 António Sérgio de Sousa (1809–1878), Portuguese nobleman and colonial administrator
 António Teixeira de Sousa (1857–1917), Portuguese politicianAntónio Teixeira de Sousa
 Antônio Teixeira de Sousa Magalhães (1848–1912), Brazilian politician
 Antônio Telles de Castro e Sousa (1891—1934), Brazilian poet
 Antônio Tibúrcio Ferreira de Souza (1837— 1885, Brazilian military leader
 António Verdial de Sousa (born 1963), East Timorese politician
 António Veríssimo de Sousa (1860–1934), Portuguese military commander of the Azores
 António Xavier de Sousa Monteiro (1829–1906), Portuguese bishop

See also
Antonio
Sousa (surname)
 Domingos António de Sousa Coutinho, 1st Marquis of Funchal (1762–1833), Portuguese diplomat and author
 Francisco Antônio de Sousa (fl 1800s), Brazilian politician
 Francisco Antônio de Sousa Queirós (1806–1891), Brazilian politician and landowner
 Francisco Antônio de Sousa Queirós Filho (1837—1917), Brazilian politician
 Inácio Antônio de Sousa Amaral (1800—1878), Brazilian politician and landowner
 João António de Sousa Pais Lourenço (born 1962) Portuguese politician and engineer
 Joaquim Antônio de Sousa Rabelo (?–1897), Brazilian politician and landowner
 José Antônio de Sousa Lima (1831—1900), Brazilian politician
 Luís António de Sousa Botelho Mourão (1722–1798), Portuguese nobleman and politician
 Luís António de Sousa Queirós (1746–1819), Portuguese-Brazilian military leader
 Manuel António de Sousa (1835–1892), Indian-Portuguese merchant and military captain
 Marcio Antonio de Sousa Junior (born 1955), Brazilian footballer
 Miguel António de Sousa Horta Almeida e Vasconcelos, 2nd Baron of Santa Comba Dão (1831– 1891), Portuguese nobleman. 
 Zeferino Antônio de Sousa (fl. 1800s), Brazilian politician